Adams is a city in Umatilla County, Oregon, United States,  located about  northeast of Pendleton on Oregon Route 11. The population was 350 at the 2010 census. It is part of the Pendleton–Hermiston Micropolitan Statistical Area.

History
Adams was named for a local homesteader, John F. Adams. Adams post office was established in 1883. The city was incorporated by the Oregon Legislative Assembly on February 10, 1893.

Geography

Climate
According to the Köppen Climate Classification system, Adams has a warm-summer Mediterranean climate, abbreviated "Csa" on climate maps.

Demographics

2010 census
As of the census of 2010, there were 350 people, 133 households, and 92 families living in the city. The racial makeup of the city was 91.4% White, 0.3% African American, 2.0% Native American, 2.3% from other races, and 4.0% from two or more races. Hispanic or Latino of any race were 6.9% of the population.

There were 133 households, of which 32.3% had children under the age of 18 living with them, 52.6% were married couples living together, 7.5% had a female householder with no husband present, 9.0% had a male householder with no wife present, and 30.8% were non-families. 26.3% of all households were made up of individuals, and 12.8% had someone living alone who was 65 years of age or older. The average household size was 2.63 and the average family size was 3.12.

The median age in the city was 40.6 years. 24.6% of residents were under the age of 18; 6% were between the ages of 18 and 24; 25.5% were from 25 to 44; 27.7% were from 45 to 64; and 16.3% were 65 years of age or older. The gender makeup of the city was 54.0% male and 46.0% female.

2000 census
As of the census of 2000, there were 297 people, 106 households, and 80 families living in the city. The population density was 863.1 people per square mile (337.3/km). There were 118 housing units at an average density of 342.9 per square mile (134.0/km). The racial makeup of the city was 95.96% White, 2.02% Native American, 0.67% Asian, 0.34% from other races, and 1.01% from two or more races. Hispanic or Latino of any race were 0.34% of the population.

There were 106 households, out of which 31.1% had children under the age of 18 living with them, 65.1% were married couples living together, 7.5% had a female householder with no husband present, and 23.6% were non-families. 22.6% of all households were made up of individuals, and 8.5% had someone living alone who was 65 years of age or older. The average household size was 2.75 and the average family size was 3.16.

In the city, the population was spread out, with 29.0% under the age of 18, 7.7% from 18 to 24, 29.3% from 25 to 44, 22.6% from 45 to 64, and 11.4% who were 65 years of age or older. The median age was 35 years. For every 100 females, there were 102.0 males. For every 100 females age 18 and over, there were 90.1 males.

The median income for a household in the city was $42,500, and the median income for a family was $45,556. Male median income was $33,750, and female  median income was $21,538. The per capita income for the city was $14,974. About 4.3% of families and 6.4% of the population were below the poverty line, including 3.1% of those under the age of eighteen and none of those sixty five or over.

References

External links
 Entry for Adams in the Oregon Blue Book
 

Cities in Oregon
Cities in Umatilla County, Oregon
Pendleton–Hermiston Micropolitan Statistical Area
1883 establishments in Oregon
Populated places established in 1883